Yamen Glacier is the 10 km long and 4 km wide glacier in Gromshin Heights on the east side of northern Sentinel Range in Ellsworth Mountains, Antarctica.  It is situated northeast of Vicha Glacier.  The glacier drains northeastwards along the north slopes of Branishte Peak and joins Rutford Ice Stream.

The glacier is named after the settlement of Yamen in Western Bulgaria.

Location
US mapping in 1961.

See also
 List of glaciers in the Antarctic
 Glaciology

Maps
 Newcomer Glacier.  Scale 1:250 000 topographic map.  Reston, Virginia: US Geological Survey, 1961.
 Antarctic Digital Database (ADD). Scale 1:250000 topographic map of Antarctica. Scientific Committee on Antarctic Research (SCAR). Since 1993, regularly updated.

References
 Yamen Glacier SCAR Composite Gazetteer of Antarctica
 Bulgarian Antarctic Gazetteer Antarctic Place-names Commission (Bulgarian)
 Basic data (English)

External links
 Yamen Glacier. Copernix satellite image

 

Glaciers of Ellsworth Land
Bulgaria and the Antarctic